is a retired Japanese badminton player. He has been a runner-up of the All England three times (2013, 2014 and 2016) along with his partner, Hiroyuki Endo. He competed at the 2010 and 2014 Asian Games.

Career 
Hayakawa won the first point in the 2014 Thomas Cup finals with Hiroyuki Endo beating 2004 World Junior Champions Hoon Thien How and Tan Boon Heong and lead the momentum for the Japanese team to claim the Thomas Cup for the first time, being the fourth nation to win Thomas cup after Indonesia, China and Malaysia. He retired in November 2016 and currently is the coach for Japanese B national team.

Achievements

BWF World Championships 
Men's doubles

Asian Championships 
Men's doubles

Mixed doubles

BWF Superseries 
The BWF Superseries, which was launched on 14 December 2006 and implemented in 2007, was a series of elite badminton tournaments, sanctioned by the Badminton World Federation (BWF). BWF Superseries levels were Superseries and Superseries Premier. A season of Superseries consisted of twelve tournaments around the world that had been introduced since 2011. Successful players were invited to the Superseries Finals, which were held at the end of each year.

Men's doubles

  BWF Superseries Finals tournament
  BWF Superseries Premier tournament
  BWF Superseries tournament

BWF Grand Prix 
The BWF Grand Prix had two levels, the Grand Prix and Grand Prix Gold. It was a series of badminton tournaments sanctioned by the Badminton World Federation (BWF) and played between 2007 and 2017.

Men's doubles

Mixed doubles

  BWF Grand Prix Gold tournament
  BWF Grand Prix tournament

BWF International Challenge/Series 
Men's doubles

Mixed doubles

  BWF International Challenge tournament
  BWF International Series tournament

References

External links 

 
 
 
 

1986 births
Living people
Sportspeople from Shiga Prefecture
Japanese male badminton players
Badminton players at the 2016 Summer Olympics
Olympic badminton players of Japan
Badminton players at the 2010 Asian Games
Badminton players at the 2014 Asian Games
Asian Games competitors for Japan
Badminton coaches
21st-century Japanese people